Hermann Martens (16 April 1877 in Berlin – 1916) was a German track cyclist who competed in the 1908 Summer Olympics.

He won the silver medal together with his teammates Karl Neumer, Max Götze, and Rudolf Katzer in the team pursuit. He also competed in the 660 yards sprint, in the 5000 metres race, in the 20 kilometres, and in the 1000 metre sprint, but was always eliminated in the first round. He also participated in the 100 kilometres race, but was not able to finish the race. In the tandem event together with Alwin Boldt he was also dropped out in the first round.

References

External links
profile

1877 births
1916 deaths
German male cyclists
German track cyclists
Cyclists at the 1908 Summer Olympics
Olympic silver medalists for Germany
Olympic cyclists of Germany
Cyclists from Berlin
Olympic medalists in cycling
Medalists at the 1908 Summer Olympics